Evonium is a purported lost city in Scotland first described by Hector Boece in his 16th-century Scotorum Historiae. According to Boece, it hosted the coronation of forty kings and was located in the Lochaber area. Boece's translator John Bellenden substituted Dunstaffnage for Evonium which led to the belief that the Stone of Scone was once kept at Dunstaffnage Castle.

Writer A. J. Morton has suggested that if Evonium actually existed it could have been located at Irvine, Ayrshire, known historically as Erewyn, Ervin or Erevine.

References

16th century in Scotland
Lost cities and towns
Former cities in Scotland
Geography of Argyll and Bute
Geography of North Ayrshire
Scottish monarchy